Mount Currie may refer to:

Mount Currie (British Columbia), the northernmost summit of the Garibaldi Ranges in British Columbia
Mount Currie, British Columbia, a rural community near Pemberton, British Columbia, named for the summit
Mount Currie First Nation and Mount Currie Indian Band are alternate names of the Lil'wat Nation, a band government of the Lil'wat (Lower St'at'imc) people at Mount Currie, British Columbia
Mount Currie Indian Reserve No. 1, an Indian Reserve at Mount Currie, British Columbia under the administration of the Mount Currie First Nation
Mount Currie Indian Reserve No. 2, an Indian Reserve at Mount Currie, British Columbia under the administration of the Mount Currie First Nation
Mount Currie Indian Reserve No. 6, an Indian Reserve at Mount Currie, British Columbia under the administration of the Mount Currie First Nation
Mount Currie Indian Reserve No. 7, an Indian Reserve at Mount Currie, British Columbia under the administration of the Mount Currie First Nation
Mount Currie Indian Reserve No. 8, an Indian Reserve at Mount Currie, British Columbia under the administration of the Mount Currie First Nation
Mount Currie Indian Reserve No. 10, an Indian Reserve at Mount Currie, British Columbia under the administration of the Mount Currie First Nation
Mount Currie (Alberta), a mountain in Alberta, Canada
Mount Currie (Antarctica), a mountain in Antarctica
Mount Currie (Australia), a mountain in the  Northern Territory of Australia
Mount Currie (South Africa), a summit in South Africa
The Mount Currie protected area in the East Griqualand district of KwaZulu-Natal, South Africa around the mountain of the same name.